Pacific coast may be used to reference any coastline that borders the Pacific Ocean.

Geography

Americas

North America 
Countries on the western side of North America have a Pacific coast as their western or south-western border. One of the notable exceptions is Panama, where the Pacific coast is primarily on its southern border. The first Europeans to see the Pacific Ocean were able to do so by crossing the narrow Isthmus of Panama. The unique position of Panama in relation to the Pacific Ocean resulted in the ocean initially being named the South Sea.

 West Coast of Canada
 Geography of Costa Rica
 Geography of El Salvador
 Geography of Guatemala
 Geography of Honduras
 Pacific Coast of Mexico
 Geography of Nicaragua
 Geography of Panama
 West Coast of the United States
 Geography of Alaska

South America 
Only four countries in South America have a Pacific coast as a part (or all) of their border.

 Geography of Chile
 Geography of Colombia
 Geography of Ecuador
 Geography of Peru

Asia-Pacific

Asia 
Countries and territories on the eastern, north-eastern, and south-eastern sides of Asia have a Pacific coast as a part (or all) of their border.

 Geography of Brunei
 Geography of Cambodia
 Geography of China
 Geography of Hong Kong
 Geography of Macau
 Geography of East Timor
 Geography of Indonesia
 Geography of Japan
 Geography of Malaysia
 Geography of North Korea
 Geography of the Philippines
 
 Geography of Singapore
 Geography of South Korea
 Geography of Taiwan
 Geography of Thailand
 Geography of Vietnam

Oceania 
Australia's Pacific coast is on its eastern border. Except the Ashmore and Cartier Islands and the Australian Indian Ocean Territories, all the other countries and territories in Oceania have their entire border surrounded by the Pacific Ocean.

 Geography of American Samoa
 Geography of Australia
 Geography of the Coral Sea Islands
 Geography of Norfolk Island
 Geography of Clipperton Island
 Geography of the Cook Islands
 Geography of Easter Island
 Geography of Fiji
 Geography of French Polynesia
 Geography of Guam
 Geography of Hawaii
 Geography of Kiribati
 Geography of the Marshall Islands
 Geography of the Federated States of Micronesia
 Geography of Nauru
 Geography of New Caledonia
 Geography of New Zealand
 Geography of Tokelau
 Geography of Niue
 Geography of the Northern Mariana Islands
 Geography of Palau
 Geography of Papua New Guinea
 Geography of Bougainville
 Geography of the Pitcairn Islands
 Geography of Samoa
 Geography of Solomon Islands
 Geography of Tonga
 Geography of Tuvalu
 Geography of the U.S. Minor Outlying Islands
 Geography of Baker Island
 Geography of Howland Island
 Geography of Jarvis Island
 Geography of Johnston Atoll
 Geography of Kingman Reef
 Geography of Midway Atoll
 Geography of Palmyra Atoll
 Geography of Wake Island
 Geography of Vanuatu
 Geography of Wallis and Futuna

See also
 List of sovereign states and dependent territories in Oceania
 South Sea (disambiguation)

External links
 

 01
C
Coasts
Coastal geography